

201001–201100 

|-id=019
| 201019 Oliverwhite ||  || Oliver L. White (born 1984), a research scientist at the NASA SETI Institute who worked  for the New Horizons mission to Pluto as a science team post-doctoral researcher for geophysics investigations || 
|-id=023
| 201023 Karlwhittenburg ||  || Karl E. Whittenburg (born 1966), a mission operations engineer at the Johns Hopkins University Applied Physics Laboratory who worked  for the New Horizons mission to Pluto as the Deputy Mission Operations Manager || 
|}

201101–201200 

|-bgcolor=#f2f2f2
| colspan=4 align=center | 
|}

201201–201300 

|-id=204
| 201204 Stevewilliams ||  || Stephen P. Williams (born 1953), a software engineer at the Johns Hopkins University Applied Physics Laboratory who worked for the New Horizons mission to Pluto as the Command and Data Handling Engineering Lead || 
|}

201301–201400 

|-id=308
| 201308 Hansgrade ||  || Hans Grade (1879–1946), a German aviation pioneer and founder of the first German flight school || 
|-id=372
| 201372 Sheldon ||  || Erin Sheldon (born 1974), an American astronomer with the Sloan Digital Sky Survey || 
|}

201401–201500 

|-id=497
| 201497 Marcelroche ||  || Marcel Roche (1920–2003), a Venezuela physician, scientist and scientific leader || 
|}

201501–201600 

|-bgcolor=#f2f2f2
| colspan=4 align=center | 
|}

201601–201700 

|-bgcolor=#f2f2f2
| colspan=4 align=center | 
|}

201701–201800 

|-id=751
| 201751 Steinhardt ||  || Charles Steinhardt (born 1981), an American astronomer and a contributor to the Sloan Digital Sky Survey || 
|-id=777
| 201777 Deronda ||  || Deronda Mayes (born 1957), assistant astronomer at Table Mountain Observatory in California, who operates the 0.4-meter telescope. She is in charge of observatory procurement needs, as well as all annual telescope operational safety reviews, along with TMO property accountability. She is credited with the discovery of asteroid . || 
|}

201801–201900 

|-bgcolor=#f2f2f2
| colspan=4 align=center | 
|}

201901–202000 

|-bgcolor=#f2f2f2
| colspan=4 align=center | 
|}

References 

201001-202000